Raat Baaki Hai is a ZEE5 Hindi thriller movie starring Rahul Dev, Anup Soni, Paoli Dam, Saanand Verma and Dipannita Sharma directed by Avinash Das. Based on Atul Satya Koushik’s Hindi play Ballygunge 1990, the film is set in Rajasthan. The film is about a murder investigation of a top actress, who was found murdered in the suite of the hotel where she was engaged.

Plot 
On their engagement night, Kartik Sharma’s fiancé Vaani Chopra is brutally murdered. After his Kartik's fiancee is murdered, he becomes the prime suspect as he goes on the run and lands at the palatial house of the King, Raja Sujan Singh. There he and Vasuki (his former lover) end up meeting each other after 12 years. On the other hand, a sharp-witted cop, Rajesh Ahlawat is roped in to investigate the murder.

Cast 
 Rahul Dev as Rajesh Ahlawat
 Anup Soni as Kartik Sharma
 Paoli Dam as Vasuki Singh
 Dipannita Sharma as Vaani Chopra
 Saurabh Sachdeva as Rehan Mustafa
 Sameer Malhotra as Raja Sujan Singh
 Aakash Dahiya as S.I. Sangram Singh
 Saanand Verma as Manohar

Release
Raat Baaki Hai was premiered on ZEE5 on 16 April 2021.

Reception 
Vibhor from Freepress Journal wrote a review with title "It’s better to go to sleep than watch this". He expanded: "The best part about this one hour forty minute film is that it is for one hour forty minutes only. It would have been a real task to sit through another five minutes of this snoozefest." Archika Khurana from Times of India wrote "Raat Baaki Hai circles around a murder investigation and the existing lives of the lead characters which could have been an interesting watch but it lacks the right elements to entertain. Despite some known faces and convincing acts, it comes across as a not-so-thrilling suspense drama." Inext wrote about the film "Raat Baaki Hai claims to be a suspense thriller drama but it is not suspense thriller from any angle. When you can predict what's going to happen next only by seeing the face of artists, you don't call such films thrillers but scam." Tatsam Mukherjee from Firstpost stated the film as "a simple murder mystery with no element of intrigue or entertainment".

References

External links
 
 Raat Baaki Hai on ZEE5

2021 films
Indian thriller films
2020s Hindi-language films
Films not released in theaters due to the COVID-19 pandemic
Films postponed due to the COVID-19 pandemic
ZEE5 original films